PNS/M Hangor (S-131) (nicknamed: "Shark") was a  diesel-electric submarine that served in the Pakistan Navy from 1969 until its decommissioning in 2006. It is the first submarine to sink a ship after World War II.

Hangor (S131) was the lead ship of her class, designed and constructed by France after a long and complicated negotiation which started in 1966. In 1969, Hangor was commissioned in the Submarine Command (SUBCOM) when she reported back to her home base in Karachi from Paris. Hangor, under the command of Commander Ahmed Tasnim, sank the Indian Navy's , an anti-submarine frigate, with one homing torpedo on 9 December 1971 during the western front of the third war with India in 1971. 

This was the only recorded submarine kill after World War II until the Falklands War, when the Royal Navy's nuclear submarine  sank the Argentine Navy cruiser . The strategic impact was even more significant as the Indian navy cancelled "Operation Triumph", the third missile attack, which was to be launched on 10 December.

Acquisition and initial deployment

After the second war with Pakistan in 1965, the Indian Navy underwent a rapid modernization and expansion, causing the Pakistan Navy's focus to shift towards strengthening their existing Submarine Command (COMSUBS) due to being unable to acquire fighter jets from the Air Force. France renamed these submarines according to the Pakistan Navy's standards.

Training of the crew took place in 1968. Notably, Hangors officers that served in 1971 included:
Commander Ahmed Tasnim, the commanding officer. 
Lieutenant-Commander A. U. Khan, second-in-command and the navigation officer
Lieutenant-Commander R. A. Kadri, the electrical officer.
Lieutenant Fasih Bokhari, the navigation officer.

The ship's first war-time deployment was in August 1971, gathering intelligence on the Indian Navy and clearing the Manora Island and Ormara Bay in the coastal areas of Pakistan. Hangor reported back to base in September 1971 but was again deployed in November 1971.

According to Rear-Admiral R. A. Kadri in 1999, the assigned mission was considered quite difficult and dangerous, with the submarine squadron sailing under the assumption that the dangerous nature of this mission meant a great mortal risk to the submarine and her crew.

Service with Pakistan Navy

Western Front of Indo-Pakistani war of 1971

On the midnight of 26 November 1971, Hangor sailed from its base with a load of torpedoes to patrol the Bombay Harbour. Soon after deployment, defects were noted in the ship's computers but were soon repaired as the patrol continued. Initially, there were two contacts that were picked up by the computers and were identified as warships, ranging . The ship could not pursue its targets due to the warships' speed and the distance between them. Hangors crew did, however, manage to predict the warships' movements.

At midnight of 2/3 December 1971, Hangor, remaining submerged in a northerly direction, investigated radio transmissions intercepted from the warships belonging to the Western Naval Command of the Indian Navy that would launch a first missile attack on Karachi. Hangor was passed over by the large Squadron of the Western fleet of the Indian Navy. The cruiser  passed directly over the submarine.

All transmissions and computers were shut down to avoid the detection by the Indian fleet, and once passed over Cmdr. Tasnim broke the radio silence and communicated with the Navy NHQ to warn of the attack, but this message was intercepted.

On 4 December 1971, Navy NHQ communicated with Hangor, giving her war codes to attack the Indian Navy's armada.

On 9/10 December 1971, at 19:00, Hangor detected the possible signature of the two Indian frigates dispatched in response to the intercepted communications. Later, around midnight, Cdr. Tasnim ordered Hangor to dive deep to carry out a blind (sonar only) approach as the torpedo team concentrated on tracking the two targets as they gradually came within firing range. The torpedo was tracked, but no explosion was heard. It was then speculated that the torpedo had missed its target, and the moment Kirpan sensed the torpedo, the captain of Kirpan realized that the ship was under attack turned away at maximum speed from the scene. Hangor had struck first, but had failed to hit hard.

As Kirpan fled the battle, Khukri, to its south, knowing the direction from which the torpedo had come, increased speed and came straight for an attack on Hangor. As Khukri came in for an attack, Hangors attack team shifted targeting to Khukri, quickly firing a second torpedo. The second torpedo was fired at the approaching Khukri and was followed by a heavy and loud explosion as the torpedo struck the magazine of Khukri. Shortly before the impact, Hangor detected the direct orders of Captain Mulla ordering evasive manoeuvres.

INS Kirpan moved into the scene, hoping to engage Hangor with a hasty dropping of the depth charge, but a third torpedo locked onto Kirpans tail, followed by a loud explosion. Kirpan was not sunk but there was a substantial amount of physical damage that led Kirpan to flee the battle scene by turning west towards deep waters.

Hangor moved into searching for survivors in a hope to rescue but Khukri sank in matter of two minutes before Hangor could reach it. The casualty roster listed 18 officers and 176 sailors aboard Khukri and it remains as the Indian Navy's most costly wartime casualty in terms of lives lost. Kirpan returned to the scene next day to execute the rescue operation along with INS Katchal but left without success.

After this incident, there was a massive search and destroy mission led by the Western Fleet, indiscriminately dropping depth charges hoping to sink Hangor. Cdr. Tasnim had Hangor submerged for almost a week, returning to its base with depleted lead batteries during the night of 13 December 1971.

According to his personal admission in 2001, Tasnim maintained: "An extensive air search combined with surface ships made our life miserable but with the intelligent evasive action we managed to survive these attacks and arrived in Karachi safely after the ceasefire."

Legacy

Decommissioning and preservation

Over the successive years, it served in the Navy with distinction until decommissioning in 2006. In a ceremony on 2 January 2006, Hangor was decommissioned from the Pakistan Navy; it was soon converted to serve as a museum ship at Pakistan Maritime Museum.

In its memory, Pakistan remembers and celebrates 9 December as Hangor Day.

Honors and awards

In recognition of her service, Hangor was decorated with multiple gallantry and wartime awards and honors. She is regarded in the Navy as having the highest number of operational gallantry awards given to a single warship of Pakistan Navy.

In popular culture 
Hangor has been featured in a number of Pakistani dramas and films. An example of this is the film Hangor S-131.

See also 

 Timeline of the Bangladesh Liberation War
 Mitro Bahini order of battle
 Pakistan Army order of battle, December 1971
 Evolution of Pakistan Eastern Command plan
 Operation Searchlight
 Indo-Pakistani wars and conflicts
 Operation Dwarka

References

External links
 
 

1968 ships
Ships built in France
Hangor-class submarines (Daphné-class)
Indo-Pakistani War of 1971
Museum ships in Pakistan